Pucher is the surname of the following notable people:
Johann Pucher (1814–1864), Slovene priest, scientist and photographer
Max Pucher (born 1954), Austrian businessman and racing driver 
Peter Pucher (born 1974), Slovak ice hockey forward
René Pucher (born 1970), Slovak ice hockey player
Solomon Pucher (1829–1899), rabbi
Thomas Pucher (born 1969), Austrian architect

See also 
Bucher

German toponymic surnames
Surnames of Austrian origin